Leopoldo Navarro Bermudez (October 22, 1917 - October 25, 2014) was the vice president of Nicaragua, in the administration of president Arnoldo Alemán.

Early life

Bermudez was born on 22 October 1917 to J.Gonzalez Duarte and Dolores Bermudez Duarte in Managua, Nicaragua. He pursued primary and secondary education in Costa Rica. He was a doctor and surgeon by profession. He served as head of pathology departments in hospitals of various regions of Nicaragua.

In 1968, he joined the Liberal constitutional movement. Then he joined the Constitutionalist Liberal Party in 1981.

Career

He was elected as a deputy of the National assembly of Nicaragua from PLC, and served from 1997 to 2001. In 2000, he was elected as a vice president of the national assembly. In 2000, Aleman appointed him as the Vice President of Nicaragua and served until January 2002.

Later life

He pursued legislative career in PARLACEN. He successfully sought for national assembly after retiring from PARLACEN and was a deputy from 2007 to 2012.

Death

He died on 25 October 2014, in Managua, Nicaragua.

References

Vice presidents of Nicaragua
1917 births
2014 deaths
People from Managua